The Chairman of Mirpurkhas (Urdu: چیرمین میرپورخاص ) is the mayor who heads the local government of Mirpurkhas, the fourth largest city of Sindh, Pakistan. Previously, the authority had resided with the district's Nazim.

Local government 
While Pervez Musharraf was the President of Pakistan, Mirpurkhas was administrated by the local Nazim of the district government.

The position was dissolved in 2010,  after the PPP came to power.

The Nazim was reinstated in 2016 after local government order (SPLGO 2013) came into effect. This order designated that the urban city areas of Mirpurkhas would be governed by the chairman of the municipal committee, while the rural areas would be governed by a district council and various town committees.

Mayors 
The following list is of Mirpurkhas local government chairmen in recent years.

Election Results 2015 

The following are the results of the elections which were conducted on 19 November 2015.

References 

Lists of mayors of places in Pakistan
Mirpur Khas District